Östanbäck Monastery is a Lutheran Benedictine monastery for men in the Church of Sweden, located outside Sala in Sweden.

History
The background of the monastery lies in the Lutheran High Church Movement. On 14 February 1960, four theological students, from both the University of Lund and the University of Uppsala, took their vows, forming the Holy Cross Fraternity under the spiritual guidance of an Anglican Franciscan priest in preparation for the establishment of a religious order. The period of studying and preparation later led them towards the Benedictine renewal in the Roman Catholic Church of the Second Vatican Council.

Finally the first brethren moved to Östanbäck in November 1970. The chapel and monastery were consecrated on 20 July 1975 by Bishop Bengt Sundkler.

Present day
The brethren follow the Rule of St. Benedict.

The monastery has a candle factory in Östanbäck, which produces candles in different sizes and shapes, among them Paschal candles.

The leader of the monastery is Father Caesarius Cavallin, OSB. Like the Anglican Benedictine abbots, he is regularly invited as an observer to the Benedictine abbots' conferences in Rome.

Comparable communities
Other Lutheran Benedictine communities for men are "The Congregation of the Servants of Christ" at St. Augustine's House in Oxford, Michigan, United States, and the Priory of St. Wigbert in Germany.

References

External links

Official website

Lutheran monasteries in Sweden
Benedictine monasteries in Sweden
20th-century Christian monasteries